Generation Gap is an American game show that premiered on ABC on July 7, 2022. The series is hosted by Kelly Ripa.

Format

Generation Gap is a comedy game show with children working with older adults, usually their grandparents, to answer questions about pop culture, past and present. The youngest member of the winning team's family then gets to pick a potential grand prize: either a new car or a toy aimed for smaller children.

Production
On August 5, 2019, it was announced that ABC had ordered the series with Mark Burnett, Jimmy Kimmel and Barry Poznick as executive producers. The series is spun off from a recurring segment of Kimmel's late-night talk show Jimmy Kimmel Live!. On April 7, 2022, it was announced that the series would premiere on July 7, 2022, with Kelly Ripa as host.

Episodes

References

External links

2020s American game shows
2022 American television series debuts
American Broadcasting Company original programming
English-language television shows
Television series by MGM Television